William "Bill" Harry Stovall III (born February 21, 1960) is an American politician. He was a member of the Arkansas House of Representatives, serving from 2001 to 2007. He is a member of the Democratic party.

References

Living people
Democratic Party members of the Arkansas House of Representatives
1960 births